Fadak was a village with fertile land in an oasis near Medina. The takeover of Fadak by Muslims in 629 CE was peaceful and a share of it thus belonged to the Islamic prophet Muhammad. After Muhammad died in 632, Fadak was confiscated from his daughter Fatima and administered as public property, despite her objections. Fadak later changed hands many times as a fief.

History

Jewish Khaybar 
In the seventh century CE, the Khaybar oasis was inhabited by Jewish tribes who made their living growing date palm trees. The oasis was divided into three regions, namely, al-Natat, al-Shiqq, and al-Katiba, probably separated by natural diversions, such as the desert, lava drifts, and swamps. Each of these regions contained several fortresses (or redoubts) containing homes, storehouses, and stables. Each fortress was occupied by a clan and surrounded by cultivated fields and palm groves. To improve their defensive capabilities, the fortresses were raised up on hills or basalt rocks.

Lifetime of Muhammad (629–632) 

After the success of Muslims in the Battle of Khaybar in 628, the Jewish inhabitants of Fadak pleaded for a peace treaty in exchange for half of their properties. Unlike Khaybar, Fadak was acquired peacefully. It was thus considered  and belonged to Muhammad in line with verse 59:6 of the Quran. There is some evidence that Muhammad gifted his share of Fadak to Fatima (in Medina) when verse 17:26 was revealed, and her agents managed the property when Muhammad was alive. This is the view of Shia authors, including al-Kulayni and al-Ayyashi. Among Sunnis, al-Suyuti and al-Dhahabi are of this view, while al-Jurjani and Ibn Kathir are uncertain whether the verse was revealed to Muhammad in Medina. The revenue of Fadak largely supported needy travelers, the poor, military expeditions, and Muhammad's family, who were forbidden from receiving general alms.

Caliphate of Abu Bakr

Confiscation of Fadak 
Following Muhammad's death in 632 and early in his caliphate, Abu Bakr is said to have seized Fadak from Fatima, and evicted her agents, possibly as a show of authority to Muhammad's clan (Banu Hashim) who had not yet pledged their allegiance to Abu Bakr, or perhaps in retaliation for his exclusion by the Banu Hashim from the funeral rites of Muhammad. The confiscation of Fadak by Abu Bakr is the Shia view. In Sunni sources, the charge of usurpation appears, for instance, in the works of Ibn Hajar al-Haytami and Ibn Sa'd.

Among others, the Sunni al-Baladhuri relates that Fatima objected to Abu Bakr, saying that Fadak was a gift from her father. Her husband Ali and a maid at Muhammad's house, named Umm Aiman, are reported to have offered their testimonies in support of Fatima. By some accounts, Fatima also brought her two sons as witnesses. Abu Bakr, however, did not find their testimonies sufficient to establish the ownership of Fatima, requiring two men or one man and two women as witnesses per Islamic law. Khetia adds here that Fatima might have expected her closeness with Muhammad to strengthen her case. Shias similarly contend that the truthful Fatima would have not claimed something which was not hers. By one Shia account, Ali made this point to Abu Bakr, and added that the burden of proof was on Abu Bakr and not Fatima, whose agents administered the land at the time of the dispute. Sajjadi comments here that possession is the decisive factor in determining ownership in Islamic law. The Sunni Sibt ibn al-Jawzi and the Shia al-Tabrisi relate that Abu Bakr finally agreed to return Fadak to Fatima but was dissuaded by his ally Umar, who tore up the deed written by Abu Bakr. Other versions of this last account are collected in Sharh nahj al-balagha by the Mu'tazilite Ibn Abi'l-Hadid.

Hadith of Muhammad's inheritance 
Most likely after Abu Bakr had rejected Fatima's claim of ownership, she demanded her inheritance from the estate of her father. Abu Bakr rejected this too, saying that Muhammad had disinherited his family,  personally telling the former that prophets do not leave inheritance, and what they leave behind is public property that should be administered by the caliph. Abu Bakr was initially the sole witness to this statement, referred to as the hadith of Muhammad's inheritance. Abu Bakr added that he would administer those properties like Muhammad and that his kin should henceforth rely on general alms, which was forbidden for them in his lifetime because of their status of purity in the Quran. This prohibition is still upheld today by all schools of Islamic jurisprudence.

Authenticity 
In his al-Tabaqat al-kubra, the Sunni traditionist Ibn Sa'd furnishes the hadith of inheritance with two chains of transmission which include numerous companions of Muhammad, such as Umar, Uthman, and Zubayr. In particular, he includes in these chains some prominent Hashimites, such as Ali and Ibn Abbas, who are both reported to have vehemently disputed this claim of Abu Bakr in other sources.

On the other hand, Soufi holds that Abu Bakr is generally regarded as the only credible narrator of this hadith in Sunni sources, adding that similar reports attributed to other companions have been rejected by Sunnis. Along these lines, Sajjadi writes that all (credible) versions of this hadith are narrated from Abu Bakr, his ally Umar, his daughter Aisha, and Malik ibn Aus Al-Hadathan, though some primary sources have disputed the status of the last one as a companion of Muhammad. Twelvers reject the authenticity of the hadith of inheritance based on their own traditions, claiming also that it contradicts the Quran, where verses 19:6 and 27:16 describe how Zechariah and David both left inheritance. These ostensible contradictions with the Quran have also been noted by some contemporary authors. Nevertheless, Soufi writes that Abu Bakr's testimony is strong enough for Sunnis to make an exception to the Quranic rules of inheritance.

Sermon of Fadak 
In protest, Fatima is said to have delivered a speech at the Prophet's Mosque, known as the Sermon of Fadak. Among other sources, this sermon appears in the Sunni Balaghat al-nisa', an anthology of eloquent speeches by Muslim women, though the attribution of this speech to Fatima is mostly rejected by Sunnis. The version of this speech in Balaghat upholds Ali as the rightful successor to Muhammad, chastises Abu Bakr for denying Fatima of her inheritance, accuses him of (hadith) fabrication, and adds that Muhammad could have not contradicted the Quran, in which verse 27:16 describes how Solomon inherited from his father David, and verse 19:6 is about how Zechariah prayed for a son who would inherit from him and from the House of Jacob. Verses 8:75 and 33:6 about the rights of every Muslim to inheritance are also quoted in the speech in Balaghat.

Politics 
Madelung suggests that the caliphate of Abu Bakr was inherently inconsistent with maintaining the privileged status of Muhammad's kin and applying the Quranic rules of inheritance to them. Because Muhammad had become the owner of Fadak as the leader of the Muslim community, to inherit this property as a prerogative by the Banu Hashim might have implied their authority over the community, which is likely why Abu Bakr rejected Fatima's claims. This was the opinion of Jafri, and similar views are voiced by some others, while el-Hibri does not view the saga of Fadak as a mere financial dispute. Aslan suggests that Abu Bakr intended to strip the House of Muhammad from its privileged status, weaken its political might, and particularly undermine Ali's claim to the caliphate. Aslan also justifies Abu Bakr's efforts as partly rooted in his conviction that the caliphate must reside outside of Muhammad's clan and partly in the personal enmity between Abu Bakr and Ali. Some contemporary authors have noted the poor relations between the two men.

Caliphates of Umar, Uthman, and Ali 
The second caliph Umar expelled the Jewish residents of Fadak who then emigrated to Syria. However, unlike other Jews, the residents of Fadak were compensated by Umar after the valuation of their properties in recognition of their agreement with Muhammad to retain the ownership of half of the Fadak. Umar also altered Abu Bakr's inheritance policy by turning over Muhammad's small estate in Medina to his cousin Ali and his uncle Abbas. Fadak, however, remained under the control of Umar, though it was reportedly administered by Ali and Abbas. The third caliph Uthman also kept Fadak, though it is likely that he did not treat the land as a charitable property anymore but instead awarded it to two of his cousins, namely, Marwan and his brother. Veccia Vaglieri differs here, writing that it was Mu'awiya I who gifted Fadak to Marwan, who in turn gave it to his sons later. Madelung challenges her view, noting that the relationship between Mu'awiya and Marwan was not amicable enough to justify this gift. Mu'awiya indeed temporarily took away Fadak from Marwan during his caliphate. 

Ali, the fourth caliph and Muhammad's cousin, does not seem to have touched Fadak. Instead, he is recorded in Nahj al-balagha to have trivialized the matter during his caliphate, "Of course, all that we had in our possession under this sky was Fadak, but a group of people [Abu Bakr's party] felt greedy for it, and the other party [that of Ali] withheld themselves from it. God is, after all, the best arbiter. What shall I do: Fadak or no Fadak, while tomorrow this body is to go into the grave in whose darkness its traces will be destroyed..." A similar statement appears in Ali's letter to Uthman ibn Hunayf, his agent in Basra, in which he complains that Fadak was confiscated because of greed and envy. Alternatively, the Shia Sharif al-Murtaza contends that Ali might have practiced  (religious dissimulation) by upholding the status quo for Fadak.

Umayyad and Abbasid dynasties 
Mu'awiya I, the first Umayyad caliph, gave Fadak to Marwan as a fief and thereafter the estate changed hands numerous times during the Umayyad period. An exception is Umar II, who returned Fadak to the descendants of Fatima during his caliphate, as parts of his efforts to address the injustices inflicted upon the Alids. The Umayyad Yazid II later seized Fadak again.  

Early in the Abbasid period, al-Saffah returned Fadak to Fatima's descendants, later to be undone by his successor al-Mansur. The Abbasid caliph al-Mahdi again returned Fadak but his son al-Hadi confiscated the property. Later al-Ma'mun yet again returned Fadak and it was taken back by al-Mutawakkil, who awarded Fadak to the descendants of Umar. This cycle continued with al-Mu'tadid, al-Muktafi, and al-Muqtadir. Notably, al-Ma'mun issued a decree recognizing Fatima's right to Fadak, arguing that, as Muhammad's daughter, Fatima must have known more about the intentions of Muhammad for Fadak compared to Abu Bakr. Khetia notes that al-Ma'mun thus implicitly criticized Abu Bakr, which did not please the (Sunni) jurists, who likely pressured al-Mutawakkil to later take back Fadak. In contrast, Veccia Vaglieri dismisses the caliph's arguments as weak. As descendants of Fatima and Ali, the Shia Imams viewed Fadak as a symbol of their usurped right of succession after Muhammad and their interpretation of verse 8:41 implied that Fadak should be at their disposal, similar to Muhammad. Jafri supports their interpretation of Fadak as an extension of the succession debate.

Fadak in literature
The dispute over Fadak soon become the subject of legends. Among these is the tale of the Abbasid Harun al-Rashid, the famed caliph of Arabian Nights, appearing in the sixteenth-century work The Subtleties of People. In this story, Harun is depicted as regretting the oppression of Muhammad's family at the hands of his predecessors. He thus inquired about the boundaries of Fadak from a descendant of Fatima to return it to its rightful owners. The descendant of Fatima cautioned the caliph that Harun would no longer want to relinquish Fadak after learning about its borders. Harun pressed on nevertheless. To his indignation, the caliph was told that the first boundary of Fadak was Aden, the second was Samarkand, the third was the Maghrib, and the fourth was the Armenian Sea, encompassing virtually the entire empire of Harun. According to Virani, the fact that this claim is not pressed nor even cared for signifies that it is the Islamic world that needs Muhammad's family, not the reverse.

See also

References

Sources

External links
 Shia Viewpoint
  (1.60 MB)

Places
Historic Jewish communities
History of Saudi Arabia
Geography of Saudi Arabia
Fatimah
History of Shia Islam